Hunter Tremblay (born January 15, 1986) is a Canadian professional ice hockey winger who is currently playing for the St. John's IceCaps in the American Hockey League.

Career 
Prior to turning professional, Tremblay attended the University of New Brunswick, where he played four seasons with the UNB Varsity Reds ice hockey team which competes within the Atlantic University Sport (AUS) conference of Canadian Interuniversity Sport. He was a member of the team that won the 2011 Atlantic and Canadian Interuniversity Sport hockey championships.

Tremblay signed a one-year deal with the St. John's IceCaps of the AHL on July 5, 2012.

Awards and honors

References

External links 

1986 births
Barrie Colts players
Canadian ice hockey left wingers
Ice hockey people from Ontario
Living people
Oklahoma City Barons players
St. John's IceCaps players
Sportspeople from Timmins